The "Damien Knabben Cup" Futsal Invitational Tournament in Taipei, or simply Damien Knabben Cup, is an invitational futsal tournament held by Taipei Futsal Association. It started from 2006, under the name Taipei International Invitational Futsal Tournament. In 2007, it was renamed to Damien Knabben Cup in remembrance of Damien Knabben, late manager of Chinese Taipei national futsal team who died on April 2, 2006.

Summaries

See also
 List of sporting events in Taiwan

Recurring sporting events established in 2006
Futsal competitions in Asia
International futsal competitions hosted by Taiwan